The island country of Barbados has more than  of beaches of both pink and white sands, which are made of coral reefs that have been ground into a very fine powder by the waves of the ocean. Beaches on Barbados can be categorized by region: north and east coast beaches, south coast beaches, and west coast beaches. East and north coast beaches are facing the Atlantic Ocean, while the waters of the southern beaches are a combination of both the Atlantic Ocean and Caribbean Sea. The west coast, or the Platinum Coast, beaches are brimmed by the warm waters of the Caribbean.  This is a list of many of the beaches located in Barbados. There are no private beaches on the island.

Beaches

There are 61 beaches in Barbados, including the following with the parishes indicated for each beach:

Gallery

See also

Tourism of Barbados
Geography of Barbados
World beaches

References

 
Beaches
Barbados
Atlantic Ocean-related lists
Beaches
Barbados